Etoperidone,  associated with several brand names, is an atypical antidepressant which was developed in the 1970s and either is no longer marketed or was never marketed. It is a phenylpiperazine related to trazodone and nefazodone in chemical structure and is a serotonin antagonist and reuptake inhibitor (SARI) similarly to them.

Medical uses
Etoperidone was used or was intended for use as an antidepressant in the treatment of depression.

Pharmacology

Pharmacodynamics

Etoperidone is as an antagonist of several receptors in the following order of potency: 5-HT2A receptor (36 nM) > α1-adrenergic receptor (38 nM) > 5-HT1A receptor (85 nM) (may be a partial agonist) > α2-adrenergic receptor (570 nM); it has only very weak or negligible affinity for blocking the following receptors: D2 receptor (2,300 nM) > H1 receptor (3,100 nM) > mACh receptors (>35,000 nM). In addition to its receptor blockade, etoperidone also has weak affinity for the monoamine transporters as well: serotonin transporter (890 nM) > norepinephrine transporter (20,000 nM) > dopamine transporter (52,000 nM).

Pharmacokinetics
Etoperidone is metabolized in part to meta-chlorophenylpiperazine (mCPP), which likely accounts for its serotonergic effects.

Chemistry
Etoperidone is a phenylpiperazine and is chemically related to nefazodone and trazodone.

History
Etoperidone was discovered by scientists at Angelini, who also discovered trazodone. Its development names have included ST-1191 and McN-A-2673-11. The  etoperidone was proposed in 1976 and recommended in 1977. The drug was given brand names in Spain (Centren (Esteve) and Depraser (Lepori)) and Italy (Staff (Sigma Tau)) and was also given the brand names Axiomin and Etonin, but it is not entirely clear if it was actually marketed; the Pharmaceutical Manufacturing Encyclopedia provides no dates for commercial introduction. According to Micromedex's Index Nominum: International Drug Directory, etoperidone was indeed previously marketed in Spain and Italy.

Society and culture

Generic names
Etoperidone is the generic name of the drug and its , while etoperidone hydrochloride is its .

Brand names
Etoperidone has been associated with the brand names Axiomin, Centren, Depraser, Etonin, and Staff.

Research
Etoperidone has been studied in dementia and found to be about as effective as thioridazine.

See also
 List of antidepressants

References

External links

5-HT2A antagonists
Abandoned drugs
Alpha-1 blockers
Alpha-2 blockers
Antidepressants
Anxiolytics
2-(3-(4-(3-chlorophenyl)piperazin-1-yl)propyl)-1,2,4-triazol-3-ones
Serotonin reuptake inhibitors
Ureas